The Very Best of Najwa Karam is Najwa Karam's first greatest hits compilation and is composed of 15 of her biggest hits from 1989 to 2000.

Track listing
"Oyoun Qalbi"
"Khaleek al-Ardh"
"Majbourah"
"Rouh Rouhi"
"Ariftu Albi Lamin"
"Maghroumeh"
"Nuqta al-Satter"
"Ma Hada La Hada"
"Hazi Helo"
"Khayarouni"
"Ma Bassmahlak"
"Sehrani"
"Naghmet Hob"
"Wrood Eddar"
"Ya Habayeb"
 Bonus "Najwa 2000" medley video

References

2001 greatest hits albums
Najwa Karam albums